The most deadly floods on record in Tasmania's history occurred in April 1929 when 22 people were killed and 40 injured.

They became known as the "great" floods and the generosity from other states in relief funds and work was invoked for some time after.

The floods helped to prompt the construction of flood levees in Launceston, Tasmania's second-largest city and an important economic centre in the North of Tasmania.

Flooding was predicted by barometers: noting that: "Barometers are now falling, due apparently to the southward movement of the depression, and further rain is to be expected, with the probable flood falls in the north-east."
A deep low-pressure cell over Victoria at 9am, Thursday 4 April 1929 produced north-easterly winds across Tasmania. Rain intensified throughout the day, with the highest rainfall totals coming in the north-eastern corner of the state, but the effects were also felt across the North of the state directly affecting Burnie.
Hobart paper, The Mercury reporting about the flood in Derby (a North-Eastern mining town) below a failed dam: 

The floods and their impact were widely reported.

Notes

References 

1929 in Australia
1929
Launceston, Tasmania
1920s in Tasmania
1929 disasters in Australia